Anna de La Grange de Stankowitch (1825–1905) was a French coloratura soprano. She was one of the most noted opera singers of the nineteenth century, a protégée of Rossini and Meyerbeer, and played Violetta in the American premiere of Verdi's La Traviata in New York in 1856. She was also a composer in her own right.

References

External links

French operatic sopranos
French composers
1825 births
1905 deaths
19th-century French women opera singers